Cerithiopsis lamyi is a species of sea snail, a gastropod in the family Cerithiopsidae. It was described by Jay and Drivas in 2002.

References

 Cecalupo A. & Robba E. (2010) The identity of Murex tubercularis Montagu, 1803 and description of one new genus and two new species of the Cerithiopsidae (Gastropoda: Triphoroidea). Bollettino Malacologico 46: 45-64.

lamyi
Gastropods described in 2002